State Research Center – Institute for High Energy Physics (IHEP) is a research organisation in Protvino (near Moscow, Moscow Oblast), Russia. It was established in 1963.

The institute is known for the particle accelerator U-70 synchrotron launched in 1967 with the maximum proton energy of 70 GeV, which had the largest proton energy in the world for five years.

The first director of the institute from 1963 to 1974 was Anatoly Logunov. From 1974 to 1993 professor Lev Solovyov (Russian: Лев Дмитриевич Соловьев) served as the director of the institute. A professor, Nikolai E. Tyurin has been the director of the institute since 2003.

In 1978, a scientist of the institute, Anatoli Bugorski, was irradiated by an extreme dose of proton beam. His demise was deemed inevitable as the doctors believed he had received a dosage far in excess of what could be considered fatal. However, he survived the accident and continued to work in the institute.

See also
 UNK proton accelerator, a powerful accelerator that was planned to be built at Protvino but was not built after the collapse of the Soviet Union
 Budker Institute of Nuclear Physics, another Russian particle physics laboratory in Novosibirsk
 Institute for Theoretical and Experimental Physics, another Russian particle physics laboratory in the vicinity of Moscow; located in Moscow proper
 Joint Institute for Nuclear Research, international particle physics laboratory in the vicinity of Moscow; located north of Moscow

References

External links 
 
 IHEP publications
 Extensive photographs of remnants of Hadron Collider many years after abandonment

Particle accelerators
Particle physics facilities
Research institutes in the Soviet Union
Moscow Institute of Physics and Technology
1963 establishments in the Soviet Union
Nuclear research institutes in Russia
Nuclear technology in the Soviet Union
Research institutes established in 1963